Isam al Khafaji (born 25 November 1950, Baghdad) is a prominent Iraqi political economist, historian and left wing  intellectual.

Life
He holds two PhD degrees in economics and social sciences. 
He taught at the University of Amsterdam, and was a visiting professor and resident scholar in many important universities like Yale University, New York University and Brown University.

His PhD thesis at the University of Amsterdam in 2002 was entitled Tormented Births: Passages to Modernity in Europe and the Middle East, which was later published as a book in 2004. An Arabic edition was published by the Egyptian National Center for Translation. 
He published scholarly papers in Arabic and English, some of which have been translated into French and German, in addition to hundreds of articles in important papers like Al-Hayat and The Guardian besides being quoted, interviewed by The New York Times, The Washington Post, the BBC, Al Arabiya and Al Jazeera. He was also a contributing editor of Middle East Report, and an adjunct scholar at the Middle East Institute in Washington. 
He was chosen by the United Nations Development Program to supervise Syria's production of its first Human Development program, and worked as a consultant to the World Bank.

Al Khafaji was a participant in the "Future of Iraq" project before the fall of Saddam Hussein's regime, and was the sole full-time Iraqi adviser to the UN Secretary General's envoy in the process of transition from the US administration to Iraqi hands.

In 2008, he was a scholar with the Netherlands Institute for Multiparty Democracy.

Works
Tormented Births: Passages to Modernity in Europe and the Middle East, I.B. Tauris, November 2004,

References

1950 births
Living people
Iraqi academics
Iraqi writers
University of Amsterdam alumni
Academic staff of the University of Amsterdam
People from Baghdad